The Northern banjo frog (Limnodynastes terraereginae) is a species of ground-dwelling burrowing frogs native to eastern Queensland and northeastern New South Wales, Australia.

Description
It is a large species of frog reaching 75 mm in length. It is brown above with occasional darker flecks. There is red-orange or scarlet markings in the thigh and flanks, which gives this species it other common name, the Scarlet-sided Pobblebonk. There is a dark band which runs from the snouth to the shoulder. It is underlined by a raised cream to orange bar. The armpit is orange and the belly is white.

Ecology and behaviour
It is a burrowing species and will spend time underground during dry periods. It is associated with dams, flooded areas and ditches in forest, woodland, cleared land or farmland. Males make a high pitched "bonk" call from concealed positions in water after heavy rains from October to May.

Eggs are laid in a large floating foamy mass. Tadpoles hatch about 2 to 3 days after laying. Tadpoles are very dark brown and reach 70 mm. Tadpole development takes about 70 days and metamorphs measure 20 mm and resemble the adult, however thigh colouration does not become apparent until about 1 week later.

Similar species
It is similar to the Eastern banjo frog, from which it can be distinguished by the red thigh colouration.

References
 
 
 
 

Limnodynastes
Amphibians of Queensland
Amphibians of New South Wales
Amphibians described in 1915
Frogs of Australia